Phidarian "Phil" Mathis (born April 26, 1998) is an American football defensive tackle for the Washington Commanders of the National Football League (NFL). He played college football at Alabama and was drafted by the Commanders in the second round of the 2022 NFL Draft.

Early life and high school
Mathis was born on April 26, 1998, in Wisner, Louisiana. He attended Franklin Parish High School prior to moving after his sophomore year to Monroe, Louisiana, where he enrolled at Neville High School. As a senior, he had 41 tackles and seven sacks. Mathis was rated a four-star recruit and committed to play college football at Alabama over offers from LSU and TCU.

College career
Mathis redshirted his true freshman season at Alabama. He played in all 15 of the Crimson Tide's games as a redshirt freshman and was named to the Southeastern Conference (SEC) All-Freshman team. Mathis had 31 tackles, five tackles for loss and 1.5 sacks with a forced fumble as the Crimson Tide won the 2021 College Football Playoff National Championship. Mathis declared for the 2022 NFL Draft following the season.

Professional career

Mathis was selected by the Washington Commanders in the second round (47th overall) of the 2022 NFL Draft. He signed his four-year rookie contract on June 21, 2022. In his NFL debut, Mathis tore the meniscus in his left knee and was placed on injured reserve.

Personal life
Mathis goes by the nickname of Phil.

References

External links 
 
 Washington Commanders bio
 Alabama Crimson Tide bio

1998 births
Living people
People from Franklin Parish, Louisiana
American football defensive tackles
Players of American football from Louisiana
Alabama Crimson Tide football players
Washington Commanders players
African-American players of American football